Mick Inkpen (born 22 December 1952) is a British author and illustrator. He is best known for his creations Kipper the Dog  and Wibbly Pig.

Background 

Inkpen was born on 22 December 1952 in Romford, Essex, England. He was educated at Royal Liberty School in Gidea Park. He is a friend of Nick Butterworth, who also grew up in Romford, and they collaborated on the 1990 book Wonderful Earth.

Awards
Inkpen has won numerous awards worldwide including The British Book Award for Lullabyhullabaloo and Penguin Small, The Children's Book Award for Threadbear, The Parents and Munch Bunch Play and Learn Award and The Right Start Petit Filous Best Toy Award for Where, Oh Where is Kipper's Bear?. He received the Children's Book Award for the 1991 work Threadbear. Kipper won a BAFTA for best animated children's film in 1998, and Kipper's A to Z won the silver medal in the 2001 Smarties Prize.

Selected works
What For (1975)

Television series 
 Kipper (1997–2001) 
 Wibbly Pig (2009-2010)
 Furry Tales (TBA) – a collection of Fairy tales using anthropomorphic animals (instead of humans)

References

Contemporary Authors: A Bio-Bibliographical Guide to Current Writers. Thomson Gale, 2005.

External links

Official site
IMDB profile
Jubilee Books biography

1952 births
Living people
English children's writers
English illustrators
People educated at the Royal Liberty Grammar School
People from Romford